Laevisuchus ("light crocodile") is a genus of theropod dinosaur from the Late Cretaceous. Its remains were discovered by Charles Alfred Matley near Jabalpur in Maastrichtian deposits in the Lameta Formation in India, and were named and described by paleontologists Friedrich von Huene and Matley in 1933.  The type species is Laevisuchus indicus. The generic name is derived from Latin laevis, "light" and the Greek name for the ancient Egyptian crocodile god, Soukhos. The specific name means "Indian" in Latin. It is known only from three cervical vertebrae (GSI K20/613, GSI K20/614 and GSI K27/696) and a dorsal vertebra (GSI K27/588). A holotype was not assigned by Huene and Matley and a lectotype has never been chosen from the syntypes. All remains except GSI K27/696 were lost; GSI K20/613 was rediscovered in 2012.

Description
Laevisuchus was a small bipedal carnivore.

Classification
Laevisuchus was originally classified by Huene as a coelurid due to the similarity of its vertebrae with those of Aristosuchus. However, an analysis in 2004 has shown it to be an abelisauroid because of its long epipophyses, a pair of foramina on the centrum, and low and triangular neural spines. The vertebrae specifically resemble those of noasaurids like Masiakasaurus and Noasaurus due to having more anteriorly placed neural spines and posteriorly reduced epipophyses

See also

 Timeline of ceratosaur research

References

External links
Dinosaurier-Info 

Late Cretaceous dinosaurs
Abelisaurs
Dinosaurs of India and Madagascar
Fossil taxa described in 1933
Taxa named by Friedrich von Huene
Taxa named by Charles Alfred Matley